Il convitato di pietra may refer to various versions of the stone guest and Don Juan story.

Il convitato di pietra, 1657 play in Naples based on Tirso de Molina's El burlador de Sevilla published 1630
Il convitato di pietra, an opera by Vincenzo Righini set to a libretto by Nunziato Porta, Prague 1776
Il convitato di pietra, opera semiseria by Giacomo Tritto set to a libretto by Giovanni Battista Lorenzi, 1783
Il convitato di pietra, an opera by Vincenzo Fabrizi reusing the libretto by Giovanni Battista Lorenzi, 1787
Il convitato di pietra, farsa by Giovanni Pacini set to a libretto attributed to Gaetano Barbieri, 1832
 Don Giovanni, o sia Il convitato di pietra, Don Giovanni Tenorio, opera by Giuseppe Gazzaniga

See also
The Stone Guest (disambiguation)